Ando was an online food delivery app that was created by David Chang. It was an online desk-lunch restaurant that offers “second generation” American food to neighborhoods in New York City.

History 
David Chang, Korean-American founder and chef of Momofuku based out of New York City an international noodle bar restaurant, released Ando in May 2016.

The name is based on continuing Chang's homage to Momofuku Ando, the inventor of instant noodles.

The inception of Ando began in 2013 in collaboration with Expa, the startup lab created by Uber's Garrett Camp. Hooman Radfar, Expa partner, helped Chang build the Ando app. Ando is Chang's newest restaurant concept, making it the 15th concept under Chang's restaurant group, Momofuku Group. Chang started his first restaurant, Momofuku, in 2004. He named the restaurant “Momofuku” to pay homage to the inventor of instant ramen, Momofuku Ando, stating it was the meal that got him through college.

In November 2016, Ando secured $7 million in Series A funding to help expand delivery locations in New York City. Other angel investors include Jimmy Fallon, Aziz Ansari, the chairman of Estée Lauder, a co-founder of Warby Parker, and the founder of Soul Cycle.

Ando was acquired by Uber Eats in January 2018.

Offering 
The menu was designed by Chang and J.J Basil, former WD-50 chef, which features American cuisine like cheesesteaks, donuts and Milk Bar cookies. Ando has stated that its menu and food selection is “designed for delivery,” meaning the food is likely to cope with being out of the kitchen for longer periods of time. Orders are accepted through the app, website or Seamless. The food is couriered via UberRush to the destination. Ando has announced that possible future features could include Facebook and Slack ordering.

References 

Online food retailers of the United States
Companies based in New York City